Craigentinny Traction Maintenance Depot (also known as Craigentinny Train Maintenance Centre) is a railway depot in the Craigentinny area of Edinburgh, Scotland. The depot is operated by Hitachi Rail with a depot code of EC.

The depot opened in 1904, as a carriage sidings and was home to InterCity 125 HSTs operated by London North Eastern Railway until 31 December 2019. It does however still maintain CrossCountry InterCity 125 sets overnight. It also services Class 220/221 Voyagers for CrossCountry and Class 397s for TransPennine Express. Hitachi Rail now undertakes maintenance on London North Eastern Railway Class 800s and 801s, ScotRail Class 385s, TransPennine Express Class 802s and Lumo Class 803s. It also maintains Class 73s for the Caledonian Sleeper.

The site comprises three maintenance sheds, two of which are supplied with 25,000 volts overhead wires, and a smaller repair shed for shorter trains and locomotives. There are a number of storage and stabling sidings which are not covered.

On 11 November 2018, Hitachi Rail took over the operation of Craigentinny Depot from London North Eastern Railway. 

Craigentinny also operates a wheel lathe at its Portobello Edinburgh site which turns out tyre damage on rail vehicle wheels for many rail operators.

References

External links

Railway depots in Scotland
Transport infrastructure completed in 1904
1904 establishments in Scotland